XHLI-FM/XELI-AM is a radio station in Chilpancingo, Guerrero. Broadcasting on 94.7 FM and 1580 AM, XHLI The station is owned by El Heraldo de México with its El Heraldo Radio news format.

History
The concession for XELI-AM was awarded in 1961. In 1994, the station obtained its FM counterpart.

References

1961 establishments in Mexico
Contemporary hit radio stations in Mexico
Mexican radio stations with expired concessions
Radio stations established in 1961
Radio stations in Guerrero
Spanish-language radio stations